Alkeste (minor planet designation: 124 Alkeste) is a main-belt asteroid, and it is an S-type (silicaceous) in composition. C.H.F. Peters discovered the asteroid on August 23, 1872, from the observatory at Hamilton College, New York State. The name was chosen by Adelinde Weiss, wife of the astronomer Edmund Weiss, and refers to Alcestis, a woman in Greek mythology.

A 20 chord stellar occultation by Alkeste was observed when the asteroid passed in front of the third magnitude star Beta Virginis on June 24, 2003. The event was visible from Australia and New Zealand.

The asteroid has been observed in 3 more stellar occultation events.

Photometric observations of this asteroid in 2016 produced lightcurves indicating a rotation period of 9.9 hours with an amplitude variation of 0.18 in magnitude. This result matched previous determinations of the spin rate. The lightcurve was found to vary over the observation period as the viewing angle changed, suggesting the shadowing of topographic features.

References

External links 
 
 

000124
Discoveries by Christian Peters
Named minor planets
000124
000124
000124
18720823